The Cathedral Basilica of SS Peter and Cecilia is a Roman Catholic church building in Mar del Plata, Argentina.

Built in Neogothic style, it is dedicated to St. Peter the Apostle and St. Cecilia.

Declared a Minor Basilica by Pius XI in 1924, upon the creation of the Roman Catholic Diocese of Mar del Plata in 1957 it became its Cathedral church.

References
 (IN SPANISH)

Roman Catholic cathedrals in Buenos Aires Province
Gothic Revival church buildings in Argentina
Roman Catholic churches completed in 1905
Tourist attractions in Mar del Plata
Buildings and structures in Mar del Plata
Basilica churches in Argentina
1905 establishments in Argentina
20th-century Roman Catholic church buildings in Argentina